The 1983–84 season was Chelsea Football Club's 70th competitive season. After five years in the Second Division, Chelsea won promotion to the First Division as champions, losing only four of their 42 league matches and pipping Sheffield Wednesday to the title on goal difference.

Season summary
Manager John Neal revamped his squad after narrowly avoiding relegation to the Third Division the previous season. New signings included goalkeeper Eddie Niedzwiecki, centre-back Joe McLaughlin, midfielder Nigel Spackman, winger Pat Nevin, and striker Kerry Dixon.

Neal also added experience in the form of veteran utility player John Hollins, who rejoined the club on a free transfer from Arsenal. Hollins had made 473 league appearances for Chelsea between 1963 and 1975 before moving to Queens Park Rangers. He retired as a player at the end of the 1983-84 season but stayed on as a coach and eventually succeeded Neal as manager in 1985.

Chelsea opened the season with a resounding 5–0 home win over Derby County. Dixon scored twice and followed up with the winner in a midweek Milk Cup tie at Gillingham, both goals in victory at Brighton and four in the return leg against Gillingham. He continued to score prolifically, ending the season as the Second Division's leading scorer with 29 goals, 34 in all competitions.

By the end of November, Chelsea lay in 2nd place behind Sheffield Wednesday, having lost only one of their opening 17 league matches - 2–1 at Hillsborough. After losing twice at home in December and at Middlesbrough in the first match of the New Year, they closed out the season with a 17 match unbeaten run. This included a remarkable draw at Cardiff in which Chelsea scored three times in the last six minutes after trailing 3–0 at half-time. Promotion was sealed by a 5–0 win over Leeds at the end of April.

With two matches of the season remaining, Chelsea trailed Sheffield Wednesday by two points, albeit with a significantly better goal difference. When Wednesday were held to a goalless draw by Manchester City in their penultimate fixture, Chelsea took advantage by beating Barnsley 3–1 to move into pole position and clinched the title with a 1–0 win at Grimsby.

Squad statistics
Substitute appearances in parentheses.

League table

Results

Second Division

Milk Cup

FA Cup

References

External links
 1983–84 season at stamford-bridge.com

1983–84
English football clubs 1983–84 season